Bowmans, previously Bowman Gilfillan, is a law firm based in Sandton, Johannesburg, South Africa, with offices in Cape Town, Dar es Salaam, Durban, Lusaka, Moka and Nairobi. It is one of the "Big Five law firms" in South Africa. Bowmans works closely with alliance firm, Aman Assefa & Associates Law Office, in Ethiopia, and best friend firms Udo Udoma & Belo-Osagie in Nigeria and Taciana Peão Lopes & Advogados Associados in Mozambique.

History
Bowman Gilfillan was formed through the merger in 1998 of three law firms – Bowman Gilfillan Hayman Godfrey (established 1902), Findlay & Tait (established 1885) and John & Kernick (established 1923).

Major deals
In 2009, the firm advised Bharti Airtel, India's largest cellular services provider in their proposed acquisition of the MTN Group, the largest announced but uncompleted merger in South Africa's history with a value of $23 billion.

References

External links
 

Law firms established in 1885
Law firms of South Africa
Companies based in Sandton
Intellectual property law firms